Masaru Kashiwahara (born 30 October 1914) was a Japanese rower. He competed in the men's eight event at the 1936 Summer Olympics.

References

External links
 

1914 births
Year of death missing
Japanese male rowers
Olympic rowers of Japan
Rowers at the 1936 Summer Olympics
Place of birth missing